Our Lady of Sorrows Church is a Roman Catholic church in Riga, the capital of Latvia. The church is situated at the address 5 Pils Street. It was built in 1785.

References

External links 
 

Roman Catholic churches in Riga
Roman Catholic churches in Latvia
Roman Catholic churches completed in 1785
18th-century Roman Catholic church buildings in Latvia